WORJ-LP was a Christian and Gospel music and Religious Teaching formatted broadcast radio station licensed to Suffolk, Virginia and serving Suffolk and Windsor in Virginia. WORJ-LP was owned and operated by The Master's House Church.

The station's license was cancelled by the Federal Communications Commission on June 12, 2019.

References

External links
 

2015 establishments in Virginia
Radio stations established in 2015
ORJ-LP
ORJ-LP
Defunct radio stations in the United States
Radio stations disestablished in 2019
2019 disestablishments in Virginia
Defunct religious radio stations in the United States
ORJ-LP